is an animated series produced by Toei Animation. It is a Japanese-produced spin-off of the well-known original Transformers animated series, and the final complete animated series from the original "Generation 1" era.

Development
Following the conclusion of the American Transformers cartoon series in 1987, Takara, the Japanese producers of the Transformers toyline, opted to create unique anime for their shores to advertise their own version of the Transformers toyline, which began to grow further and further apart from its American progenitor. After Transformers: The Headmasters in 1987 and Transformers: Super-God Masterforce in 1988, Transformers: Victory was produced in 1989.

These Japanese-exclusive Transformers series had been moving further and further away from the stylistic roots of the American series, and Victory represents this divergence at its greatest. The visual style of Victory is derived heavily from the anime of the time, with the transformations of the robots being treated as more monumental, presented through more dynamic and lengthy stock footage. Still frame effects and re-used animation were used wherever possible to compensate for high levels of animation compared to previous series, possibly due to budget cuts at the time.

Despite his apparent death in The Transformers: The Movie, Wheeljack returned during the death of God Ginrai/Birth of Victory Leo saga, along with Perceptor from the original series, with God Ginrai and Minerva from Transformers: Super-God Masterforce returning too.

Story
Victory is the story of the new Autobot (Supreme Commander, Star Saber, defending the Earth against the forces of Deszaras (though commonly in the English fandom is known by "Deathsaurus"), the Decepticons' new Emperor of Destruction. Deszaras desires the planet's energy to reactivate his massive planet-destroying fortress, sealed away in the Dark Nebula long ago by Star Saber. The series eschews the story arc-based approach of Headmasters and Masterforce, returning to the American show's method of episodic adventures that did little to alter the status quo of the series, with a heavy emphasis on action, complemented by dynamic animation.
Its cast consists almost entirely of brand new characters (although there are some guest appearances from characters on earlier shows).

Victory's story is told over thirty-two original episodes. However, the broadcast series also includes six additional clip shows - bringing the total number of broadcast episodes to thirty-eight. Additionally, after the end of the series, another six additional clip shows were created by Masumi Kaneda, which were available only through home video and seldom-seen regional Japanese broadcasts, taking the total number of Victory episodes to forty-four.

Home media
The series was released in the UK on DVD in the United Kingdom by Metrodome Distribution on December 26, 2006 as Vol. 3 of "The Takara Collection". Beforehand, the episodes "Star Saber, Hero of the Universe!" and "Muiltiforce, Combine!" were included on Metrodome's Cult Sci-Fi Legends compilation DVD, released on June 5, 2006. The DVDs contain the original Japanese voice track with English subtitles.

In 2008, Madman Entertainment released the series on DVD in Australia in Region 4, PAL format.

The series was released with The Headmasters and Super-God Masterforce in the United States by Shout! Factory on August 28, 2012. The boxset contains 37 episodes on 4 DVDs.

Adaptations
Much like the two previous seasons of Transformers, The Headmasters and Super-God Masterforce, the series was dubbed by Omni Productions into English and was aired on Malaysia's RTM-1 channel, but it was later aired on Singapore's Star TV, where it was noticed by western viewers. The 6 clip show episodes that were broadcast, were also dubbed. The opening sequence for Victory was actually used for all three exclusive Japanese Transformers series under the umbrella title of Transformers Takara. Like the other dubs, it was soon purchased by Sunbow Productions. Most of the names in the dub were unchanged, as most of these characters are unique to Japan, with a few exceptions like the Micromasters had their American names, though Stake Out (Holi)'s name was accidentally changed to Fix It, who was another member of the same patrol. The Dinoforce had the names of the Monster Pretenders, as they were the same robot molds, just in different shells and coloration in robot mode. Dezaras' name was pronounced in the dub as "Deathzanrus". Additionally, 26 out of the 38 episodes of the show were dubbed into English by Transformers fans at TFCog.

A manga of the series was also produced, which included a number of plot differences, such as expanding on an element of Dezaras' toy biography that the anime discarded: a fondness for children. Playing off this, the manga introduced a young boy named Solon whose mother was killed as the result of a Decepticon attack; Dezaras thus took the young orphan in and raised him as his own son, mirroring the relationship between Star Saber and Jan; Solon also received cybernetic upgrades, armor modeled after Dezarus, and a mech called King Solon that could combine with his "father" to create King Zaras. Shuta and Cab from Masterforce were also recurring characters and allies of Jan, and the manga also featured Jan's older sister Patty, a nonexistent character in the anime; the two siblings would also don armor based on Transformers, with Jan's resembling Star Saber's while Patty's resembled Victory Leo's. Additionally, the manga has a very different conclusion from the anime: where in the cartoon Liokaiser, Dezaras, and their fortress are all destroyed, in the manga Liokaiser attempts to betray Dezarus during the final battle, and the fortress is then revealed to carry Decepticon civilians, including Dezaras' "wife" Esmeral, Leozack's sister Lyzack, and the offspring of the Dinoforce. This revelation prompts Star Saber to broker a peace with the Decepticons.

Theme songs
 Openings
 
 March 14, 1989 - December 19, 1989
 Lyricist: Konosuke Fuji / Composer: Chumei Watanabe / Arranger: Katsunori Ishida / Singers: Kaya Koji, Mori no Kijido Gassho-dan
 Episodes: 1–44

 Endings
 
 March 14, 1989 - December 19, 1989
 Lyricist: Konosuke Fuji / Composer: Chumei Watanabe / Arranger: Katsunori Ishida / Singers: Korogi '73, Mori no Kijido Gassho-dan
 Episodes: 1–44

Episodes

Chapters

References

External links
Transformers: The Japanese Collection at Shout! Factory

Transformers: Victory at IMDB

1989 anime television series debuts
1989 Japanese television series debuts
1989 Japanese television series endings
1989 manga
1990 comics endings
1980s toys
Japanese children's animated action television series
Japanese children's animated space adventure television series
Japanese children's animated science fantasy television series
Japanese children's animated superhero television series
Adventure anime and manga
Mecha anime and manga
Nippon TV original programming
Japanese television series based on American television series
Television shows set in Germany
Television series set in the 2020s
Victory
Toei Animation television